Meyrals is a commune in the Dordogne department in the southwest of France.

Meyrals is in the Périgord and, specifically, the Périgord Noir (Black Périgord), in Nouvelle-Aquitaine.

Population

Personalities
 Christophe de Beaumont, (1703–1781), archbishop of Paris, was born in Meyrals.

Events 
 Festival des épouvantails (Scarecrows) has been held every summer from 1999 to the present.
 The village of Meyrals was the setting for the film "Périgord noir" (1988), with Roland Giraud.

International relations
Meyral has one sister city:
 - Bieuzy, France

See also
Communes of the Dordogne department

References

Bibliography 
 Jacqueline Jouanel, Histoire de Meyrals, des origines à la Révolution, édition Récéad, 2007

Communes of Dordogne